Dawnstar is a superheroine appearing in comic books published by DC Comics, primarily as a member of the Legion of Super-Heroes in the 30th and 31st centuries. She was created by Paul Levitz and Mike Grell, and first appeared in Superboy and the Legion of Super-Heroes #226 (April 1977).

Fictional character biography 

Dawnstar (her real name, she has no Legion code name) is from the planet Starhaven, a world colonized by American Indians abducted from Earth by an unknown alien race in the 13th century. Her name is derived from the appearance on Earth of the planet Venus, the "morning star", and which is the reason she wears an eight-pointed star ornament on her forehead.

Dawnstar's people are of Anasazi Indian heritage. Starhavenites have pairs of large white-feathered wings that grow out of their upper backs, the result of genetic engineering by the unknown alien race that resettled them and triggered their metagenes. Their appearance is somewhat similar to Thanagarians.

Dawnstar's parents are Mistrider and Moonwalker, and her younger brothers are Greybird and Greatfire. During her late childhood and early teens, her parents built a thriving business on their daughter's ability to guide spaceships through hazardous areas of space. She also worked as a guide to hunters of animals.

Dawnstar received an invitation from Legion financier R.J. Brande to attend the Legion Academy, and reluctantly accepted the opportunity. She was first introduced to the Legionnaires at age 16 as a recent graduate of the Academy. Her tracking and navigation talents earned her full membership on her first mission. Her Legion stipend went to pay for enhancing her home world's defenses.

She served in many missions with the Legionnaires, contributing her often underrated talents at tracking and high-speed travel to perform many rescues of her colleagues, as well as investigations of personal disappearances and similar mysteries. She also brought these talents into many Legion adventures in other times, especially the 20th century. Notable here is her early role in the Crisis on Infinite Earths (1985).

Dawnstar had a lengthy, tragic romance with fellow Legionnaire Wildfire. They each respected the other's defiant, outspoken personality, although they counseled each other on working with their talents as part of a team instead of acting as individuals. Wildfire had been turned into an anti-energy being in a containment suit, and thus had no physical body, so the two were unable to have physical relationship. Later in Justice League of America #9 (2007), Dawnstar was shown in a relationship with a woman indicating she is bisexual.

After the Legion's timeline was "reset" by the Legion's battle with Mordru, Dawnstar was shown as having been possessed by an evil entity called Bounty in the new timeline, who amputated her wings and forced her to use her tracking powers as an assassin. Dawnstar was later freed from the entity's control. She was spiritually healed, but her destiny was never resolved, as she vanished shortly before the Legion's timeline was erased by the events depicted in Zero Hour (1994) and by the ensuing reboot.

Current status 
Legion of Super-Heroes (vol. 5) #15 (February 2006) featured a Barry Kitson cover which depicted Dawnstar alongside classic Legion members Blok and Tyroc. The solicitation for this issue hinted that the Legion would become the "greatest heroes of the Multiverse". Dawnstar appeared only briefly with other Legionnaires from previous iterations of the team, as a character in a "campfire story" showing the Legion's influence and the legends and myths that had sprung up around it. This cameo appearance does not appear to have been meant to take place in the series' continuity, nor was it included in the trade paperback (although it was included in a later collection).

In a JSA-JLA crossover story, "The Lightning Saga", Dawnstar (along with many other Pre-Crisis Legionnaires) was seen as a statue in Superman's Fortress of Solitude. Several members of the JSA and JLA tracked Dawnstar's flight ring to Thanagar, but she had left it there with a woman as a promise to return.

Dawnstar, with her wings and original appearance, then united with other Legionnaires in the 21st century in an effort to save someone's life (they hold rods that resemble those used for a similar action, to save Lightning Lad, in the original Silver Age Legion stories). Although it was predicted that at least one was risking his or her own life, no one died, and the Legion contingent returned to the 31st century.

The Legion shown in this story also took part in the "Superman and the Legion of Super-Heroes" story, set in its own time and involving Superman, in Action Comics #858–863 (2007–2008). In this series, Dawnstar's uniform was extensively redesigned.

Dawnstar is shown with this Pre-Crisis Legion in the limited series Final Crisis: Legion of 3 Worlds (2008). In this series, she finally admits her true feelings to Wildfire (after he nearly died trying to defend her from Superboy-Prime) and begins a positive relationship with him.

Following DC's New 52 reboot, Dawnstar was one of a number of characters shown to be stranded in the 21st century in the 2012–2013 Legion Lost series. Following that series' cancellation with issue 16, those characters remained stuck in their past. In the Future's End: 5 Years Later event she is shown to have joined the Justice League.

Powers and abilities
Dawnstar's unique powers include the ability to track life forms and objects across light years of distance and through interstellar space. She can survive in deep space for long periods of time without a spacesuit or viable atmosphere, by generating a self-sustaining environmental forcefield. In deep space, she can travel at faster-than-light speeds. In an Earth-normal atmosphere or in a sizable gravity, her speed is limited by friction & drag.

Equipment
As a member of the Legion of Super-Heroes, she is provided a Legion Flight Ring. While not needing it most of the time, she can use the signal for help, for monitoring of her location, and for other non-flight uses.

Other versions
 Dawnstar did not appear in the post-Zero-Hour ("reboot") Legion stories, except for a crossover of multiple timelines and Legions made by the Time Trapper. Several versions of her, including a demon with leather wings and ram horns, were shown at once.
 Beginning in the reboot's limited series "Legion Lost", a character was depicted called Shikari from a non-human species, the Kwai. Shikari had insectoid wings, an armored exoskeleton she could activate for space travel, and pathfinding (rather than tracking) powers of similar scope. There was some speculation that this was a revised version of Dawnstar.
 Dawnstar did not appear in the recently concluded "threeboot" Legion stories, but she has become a regular character in the new Legion Lost, which has her and several of her Legion companions from the (yet again) rebooted continuity stranded in the twenty-first century.
 An ancestor of Dawnstar, known as Wildstar is a member of the 21st century hero team R.E.B.E.L.S. She has the combined powers of Dawnstar and Wildfire.
 Dawnstar appears in DC Bombshells.
 Dawnstar is featured in the Smallville Season 11 digital comic based on the TV series.

In other media

Television 
Dawnstar makes a cameo appearance in the Legion of Super Heroes (2006) series finale "Dark Victory".

Film 
 Dawnstar appears in JLA Adventures: Trapped in Time, voiced by Laura Bailey.
 Dawnstar makes a cameo appearance in the final scene of Justice League vs. the Fatal Five as one of the Legionnaires traveling to the 21st century to honor their fallen member Star Boy.
Dawnstar appears in the film Legion of Super-Heroes (2023), voiced by Cynthia Hamidi.

Miscellaneous
 Dawnstar appears in the comic Legion of Super Heroes in the 31st Century, based on the Legion of Super Heroes animated series.

References

External links

Cosmic Teams: Dawnstar
DCU Guide: Dawnstar
Hero History: Dawnstar
Gay league profile

Characters created by Paul Levitz
Characters created by Mike Grell
Comics characters introduced in 1977
DC Comics metahumans
DC Comics extraterrestrial superheroes
DC Comics female superheroes
DC Comics LGBT superheroes
Fictional bisexual females
Fictional characters who can manipulate light
Fictional Pueblo people
Fictional Native American women